The Association for Jewish Studies (AJS) is a scholarly organization in the United States that promotes academic Jewish Studies. The AJS was founded in 1969 and held its first annual conference that year at Brandeis University. In 1976, the AJS began to publish a scholarly journal, the AJS Review. The AJS is the largest academic Jewish Studies organization in the world.

References 

Jewish organizations based in the United States
Jewish studies research institutes
Research institutes established in 1969
1969 establishments in the United States